Acanthocidaris is a genus of echinoderms belonging to the family Cidaridae.

The species of this genus are found in Australia, Indian Ocean and Malesia.

Species:

Acanthocidaris curvatispinis 
Acanthocidaris hastigera 
Acanthocidaris maculicollis

References

Cidaridae
Cidaroida genera